Rosenborg Castle is a renaissance castle located in Copenhagen, Denmark. The castle was originally built as a country summerhouse in 1606 and is an example of Christian IV's many architectural projects. It was built in the Dutch Renaissance style, typical of Danish buildings during this period, and has been expanded several times, finally evolving into its present condition by the year 1624. Architects Bertel Lange and Hans van Steenwinckel the Younger are associated with the structural planning of the castle.

History

The castle was used by Danish regents as a royal residence until around 1710. After the reign of Frederik IV, Rosenborg was used as a royal residence only twice, and both these times were during emergencies. The first time was after Christiansborg Palace burned down in 1794, and the second time was during the British attack on Copenhagen in 1801.

Architecture

Long Hall

Located on the third floor, the Long Hall was completed in 1624. It was originally intended as a ballroom. Around 1700 it was used as Royal Reception Room and for banquets. It was not until the second half of the 19th century that it became known as the "Knight's Hall".

Christian V had the hall partly modernised with twelve tapestries depicting the King's victories in the Scanian War (1675–1679). The stucco ceiling seen today is from the beginning of the 18th century. It shows the Danish Coat of Arms surrounded by the Orders of the Elephant and of Dannebrog. Side reliefs depict historical events from the first years of the reign of Frederik IV, including the liberation of the serfs, the founding of the dragoons and of the land militia among them. The frescos in the ceiling by Hendrick Krock, represent the Regalia.

Among the main attractions of Rosenborg are the coronation chair of the absolutist kings and the throne of the queens with the three silver lions standing in front. The Long Hall also contains a large collection of silver furniture, of which most is from the 17th century.

Rosenborg Collections
The castle is open to the public for tours and houses a museum exhibiting the Royal Collections, artifacts spanning a breadth of royal Danish culture, from the late 16th century of Christian IV to the 19th century. Some of these articles once belonged to the nobility and the aristocracy. The castle, now state property, was opened to the public in 1838.

Of special interest to tourists is a treasury displaying the Crown Jewels and the Danish Crown Regalia located in the castle. A Coronation Carpet is also stored there. The Throne Chair of Denmark is located in the castle. In the summer time, flowers bloom in front of the castle in the castle garden.

Gardens
The castle is situated in Kongens Have ("The King's Garden"), also known as "Rosenborg Castle Garden". The Rosenborg Castle Garden is the country's oldest royal garden and was embellished in the Renaissance style by Christian IV shortly before the construction of the main castle. Today, the gardens are a popular retreat for the people of Copenhagen, and attract an estimated 2.5 million visitors every year. Next to the castle are barracks where the Royal Life Guards is garrisoned. The Life Guard guards the castle.

Gallery

See also
 List of castles and palaces in Denmark
 Tourism in Denmark
 Oldenburg Horn

References

External links

 
 Copenhagen-Portal - Rosenborg Castle and History
 Official site
 The Association of Castles and Museums around the Baltic Sea

Castles in Denmark
Buildings and structures in Copenhagen parks
Historic house museums in Copenhagen
Museums in Copenhagen
Royal residences in Denmark
Tourist attractions in Copenhagen
Houses completed in 1624
1624 establishments in Denmark
Brick buildings and structures
Renaissance architecture in Copenhagen